The Fauve de Bourgogne is a stocky medium-sized breed of rabbit which is orange-red in color.

See also

List of rabbit breeds

References

Rabbit breeds